The Bahamas Electricity Corporation (BEC) is a government corporation that provides electricity to all of the Bahama Islands except for Grand Bahama. The corporation operates power plants at 25 locations throughout the islands, with 95,000 customers and a peak capacity of 438 MW. Most of the stations use diesel engines; a large gas-turbine plant is installed at the Blue Hills Power Station.

History
BEC was founded in 1956 by the passing of The Commonwealth of The Bahamas Electricity Act to provide water for all homes on the western coast of the island.

References

External links 

Ministry of Works and Utilities
 Bahamas Electricity Corporation

Electric power companies of the Bahamas
Government agencies established in 1956
1956 establishments in the Bahamas